The Lost & Found Family is a 2009 direct-to-video Christian film starring Ellen Bry and Lucas Till. It was released on September 15, 2009 by Sony Pictures Home Entertainment. The film was directed by Barnet Bain.

Plot
The story centers around a foster family made up of a group of misfits. Mrs. Hobbes (Ellen Bry) is all alone in the world when her husband dies, but through her faith and belief in the goodness of people, discovers she has the power to help those in need and find peace within herself. When she is left with nothing but a home her husband had bought in her name, she decides to sell the home so she can have a little money. But when she arrives in Jackson Georgia she finds it is far from what she had expected. The house is home to five foster children. She first meets Crystal, a sweet little girl whose mother was hooked to the drug Crystal and named her child after it. Then she meets Jasmine, who doesn't talk because of her past experiences. Soon she meets Justin and Teri, two teenagers with bad attitudes. Teri used to be hooked on drugs and Justin saved his father's life only to watch him die from cancer a year later. Lastly she meets Max, a young boy whose mother doesn't love him. Through these children and God, Esther begins to find courage to save the house. She soon discovers the house is a historical building and with the help of the children and the parents they save the home. Esther then finds people to invest in allowing her to build more homes for foster children. Toward the end of the movie, Jasmine speaks to Esther after years of being silent: "Thank you".

Cast

Ellen Bry as Ester Hobbes
Justin Carpenter as Travis
Teri Carpenter as Monica
Della Cole as Doctor
Lucas Till as Justin
Erin Patterson as Jasmine
Regan Lamb as Crystal
Micheal May as Max
Jeff Portell as Tony
Bruce Taylor as Judge Washington
Syvonne as Old Woman
Jessica Luza as Teri
Ken Colquit as Probation Officer
Cynthia Evans as Stephanie
Bob King as Mr. White
Greg Thompson as Jon Garrett
Stan Patterson as Cab Driver
Dolan Wilson as Owner
Tonya Stoneman as Deana

References

External links
 Official website
 
 The Lost & Found Family at ChristianCinema.com

2009 drama films
2009 films
Films about evangelicalism
American drama films
2000s English-language films
2000s American films